The Fool of the Family is a 1930 novel by the British writer Margaret Kennedy. It is the sequel to her 1924 bestseller The Constant Nymph.

In 1934, Kennedy adapted the novel into a play Escape Me Never which in turn had two film adaptations, Escape Me Never (1935) and Escape Me Never (1947).

References

Bibliography

Stringer, Jenny & Sutherland, John. The Oxford Companion to Twentieth-century Literature in English. Oxford University Press, 1996. .

1930 British novels
Novels by Margaret Kennedy
Novels set in Italy
Novels set in London
Heinemann (publisher) books
British novels adapted into plays
British novels adapted into films